María Isabel Pantoja Martín (born August 2, 1956) is a Spanish singer. She was born in the Triana district of Seville, Spain. She has released more than a dozen albums throughout a career spanning many decades, mostly of copla genre, and is known for her distinctive Andalusian style.

Biography
She was born in a Romani family of musicians. Both her father and her grandfather were singers.

Pantoja began performing precociously at the age of seven in the flamenco ensemble of her cousin Chiquetete. At 17 she met her "maestro" Juan Solano Pedrero, who wrote her first hits along with writer and poet Rafael de León. Pantoja cultivated copla, a genre in decline at the moment that she popularised again. Some of her early hits were "El Pájaro Verde", "Garlochí" or "El Señorito". In 1983 she released her first pop album, Cambiar por ti, which included the same-title song, "En la Niebla", or "Nada". From that moment, Pantoja alternated ballads and romantic songs with copla.

On April 30, 1983 she married bullfighter Francisco Rivera Pérez "Paquirri"; the wedding was widely covered by the Spanish media as they were both popular and successful and they embodied a Romantic Spain stereotype of the bullfighter and the "tonadillera". On September 26, 1984 he died in the bullring; Pantoja became known as "Spain's widow" in the media and a regular cover on gossip magazines. After a prolonged hiatus, she released the album Marinero de Luces, composed by José Luis Perales, that sold one million copies in Spain. 

In 1988, she released Desde Andalucía, an album produced by Mexican singer and songwriter Juan Gabriel. In 1989 she released Se me enamora el alma, her most commercial album, with modern programmed beats, composed by Perales.

In 1990, Pantoja starred in the film Yo soy ésa, alongside José Coronado and Loles León, directed by Luis Sanz. A year later, she starred in another film, El día que nací yo, directed by Pedro Olea, alongside Arturo Fernández and Joaquim de Almeida. 

Pantoja has released more than a dozen albums and has toured Spain and Latin America extensively over the years.

Family life
Her husband, the bullfighter Francisco Rivera Pérez, known professionally as "Paquirri", died at the age of 36 in the bullring on September 26, 1984, at the horns of the bull Avispado in Pozoblanco, Córdoba. Isabel Pantoja and "Paquirri" had a son named Francisco José Rivera Pantoja (born February 9, 1984 in Seville), better known as Kiko Rivera or "Paquirrín" by the press. Pantoja has another daughter, named like herself María Isabel Pantoja Martín (born November 8, 1995 in Lima, Peru), whom she adopted in 1996, and who is better known as Isa Pantoja or "Chabelita" by the press. Both her children are television personalities who have participated in reality shows.

Legal problems
Pantoja was arrested in April 2013 by the Spanish police. She was accused of allegedly being an accomplice of her ex-boyfriend Julián Muñoz, who was accused of money laundering, bribery among other criminal activities while he was mayor of Marbella. She was found guilty and sentenced to a 24-month prison term. She later paid approximately four million euros and made a plea to avoid having to go to prison.

On November 3, 2014 the jury in Málaga decided to deny the plea of suspension of imprisonment, and ordered the immediate entry of Pantoja in the prison complex within 3 days after the verdict. The trial and Pantoja's entry in prison were widely covered by Spanish media. She was released from jail on February 10, 2016.

Discography  
 1974 – Fue por tu voz
 1975 – Que dile y dile
 1976 – Niña Isabela
 1978 – Y no estaba muerto, no, no
 1979 – 22 abriles tengo
 1981 – Al Alimón
 1981 – Amante, amante
 1982 – ¡Viva Triana!
 1983 – Cambiar por ti
 1985 – Marinero de luces
 1987 – Tú serás mi Navidad
 1988 – Desde Andalucía
 1989 – Se me enamora el alma
 1990 – La canción española
 1992 – Corazón herido
 1993 – De nadie
 1996 – Amor eterno
 1998 – Veneno
 1999 – A tu vera
 2002 – Donde el corazón me lleve
 2003 – Soy como soy: grandes éxitos
 2003 – Mi Navidad flamenca
 2004 – Buena suerte
 2005 – By Pumpin' Dolls
 2005 – Sinfonía de la copla
 2005 – Mi canción de Navidad
 2006 – 10 boleros y una canción de amor
 2010 – Isabel Pantoja (Spanish title) / Encuentro (Latin American title)
 2016 – Hasta que se apague el sol
 2020 - Canciones que me gustan

Filmography 
 1990: Yo soy ésa
 1991: El día que nací yo

Television

References

External links
 Official site in Spanish and English 
 

1956 births
Living people
People from Seville
Romani singers
Spanish Romani people
Spanish women singers
Singers from Andalusia
People convicted of money laundering
Spanish prisoners and detainees
Women in Latin music